Portrait of Omai (also known as Omai of the Friendly Isles or simply Omai) is an oil-on-canvas portrait of Omai, a Polynesian visitor to England, by Sir Joshua Reynolds, completed about 1776.

Background
Omai (real name Mai) left the Society Islands (specifically, Raiatea) with Commander Tobias Furneaux on his ship HMS Adventure. The Adventure had left England in 1772, accompanying Captain James Cook on his second voyage of discovery in the Pacific, and visited Tahiti and Huahine in 1773. After visiting New Zealand, Omai arrived in England on Furneaux's ship in July 1774.

Omai was admired by London society, staying with the President of the Royal Society Sir Joseph Banks and meeting King George III, Dr Samuel Johnson, Frances Burney, and other English celebrities. He returned to the Pacific with Cook's third voyage in July 1776, arriving back on the island of Huahine in 1777. He stayed behind after Cook left in November 1777, and Omai died there in late 1779.

Painting
Reynolds portrayed Omai as an exotic figure—an idealised depiction echoing Jean-Jacques Rousseau's concept of a noble savage.  He stands barefoot, alone in a rural Arcadian landscape with unusual palm-like trees.  He is wearing flowing "oriental" white robes resembling a toga but perhaps intended to be tapa cloth, and a white turban or headdress of possibly Turkish or Indian inspiration, a style not known in Tahiti.  His adlocutio pose was inspired by the Apollo Belvedere; it emphasises the tattoos on his hands, but also makes classical allusions. (Reynolds first used the pose in 1752, after visiting Rome, in a portrait of Commodore Augustus Keppel.)

The work measures .  It was painted in around 1775, and was one of 12 portraits exhibited by Reynolds at the Royal Academy's eighth exhibition in 1776, to great acclaim.  It was praised as a good likeness of the subject.  The other paintings exhibited by Reynolds in 1776 included a full-length portrait of Georgiana, Duchess of Devonshire in a similarly idyllic setting.

A pencil preparatory sketch is held by the National Library of Australia as part of the Rex Nan Kivell Collection, and Yale University Art Gallery has an oval oil sketch.  The painting was reproduced as a mezzotint by Johann Jacobé, published by John Boydell in 1780.

History
Reynolds was not commissioned to paint Omai's portrait, and the work remained in his studio until his death in 1792.  It was auctioned by Greenwood's in April 1796, and acquired by the art dealer Michael Bryan for 100 guineas.  Bryan sold it to art collector Frederick Howard, 5th Earl of Carlisle, and it was displayed in the Reynolds Room at Castle Howard for 200 years.  It was not seen again at a public exhibition until it appeared at the Royal Academy in 1954.

The painting was included in the estate of George Howard, Baron Howard of Henderskelfe when he died in November 1984.  It was put on sale by his son, Simon Howard, to meet the costs of a divorce and to help with the running costs of the Castle Howard estate.  Howard offered to sell the work to the Tate Gallery, but its suggested price of £5.5 million was rejected.  Auctioned at Sotheby's in September 2001, the painting was bought by London art dealer Guy Morrison. The Antiques Trade Gazette suggested that Morrison had been subject to "Auction fever", i.e. getting carried away and bidding more than his private client had authorised him to. The hammer price of £9.4 million (sometimes quoted as £10.3 million) was a record for a work by Reynolds and then the second highest amount paid for a painting by a British artist (the record was £10.7 million, paid for John Constable's The Lock in 1990, a level now substantially passed by another sale of The Lock in 2012 and by several sales of work by Francis Bacon, including his Triptych, 1976 in 2008 and his Three Studies of Lucian Freud in 2013).

The painting was eventually acquired by Irish businessman John Magnier.  He was refused an export licence (see Reviewing Committee on the Export of Works of Art) while the Tate Gallery sought funding to make an offer to acquire the work.  An anonymous donation allowed the gallery to make an offer of £12.5 million, but Magnier refused to sell, and in the meantime he refused to allow the painting to be displayed in public in the UK.  The British government refused a permanent export licence, but a temporary export licence was granted in 2005 for 6½ years, and the painting went on display at the National Gallery of Ireland.  It was included in the Reynolds exhibition at Tate Britain in 2005. In 2012, an application for a second temporary export licence was refused, and the painting returned to the UK.

The painting was the centre of a legal case the UK courts in 2014 when the Court of Appeal (upholding an earlier decision of the Upper Tribunal, and overturning the first instance decision of the First-tier Tribunal) held that the work fell within the definition of "plant", because it was displayed in a part of Castle Howard that was open to the public.  An application to the Supreme Court for permission appeal was rejected in January 2015.  As a result, it was deemed to be a "wasting asset" and the sale of the painting was exempt from capital gains tax.  The law was changed in the 2015 Budget to close the tax loophole.

In 2022 the portrait is at risk of leaving UK unless a UK buyer with £50 million can be found. This is despite its being previously valued at £10.7m (and an export ban being placed on it for this amount), and being untested at auction since, leaving the rationale for significant jump in value very unclear. An open letter from leading academics in the field was published in the Financial Times in June 2022 in support of the retention of the portrait in the UK.

See also
 Wang-y-tong, a Chinese visitor to England also painted by Reynolds

References

 Omai, Hinchingbrooke House
 A Noble Savage in London, National Library of Australia 
 Cook & Omai: The Cult of the South Seas, National Library of Australia, 2001
  Omai Painting Sold for a Record Amount, Captain Cook Society (Originally published in Cook's Log, page 1917, volume 25, number 1 (2002))
 Reynolds wanted Omai to be a man of the world, The Daily Telegraph, 7 January 2003
 Anonymous donor steps in to help acquire Omai, Tate Gallery, 26 March 2003
 ITP 170: Omai by Sir Joshua Reynolds, Andrew Graham Dixon, 20 July 2003
 Joshua Reynolds: The Creation of Celebrity, Tate Gallery, 2005
 Joshua Reynolds:The creation of celebrity: Room guide: Room 8, Tate Gallery, 2005
 How the mighty fall, The Guardian, 21 May 2005
 Icons for our own fantasies, Financial Times, 25 May 2005
 National Gallery hangs on to Magnier’s art, for now, The Sunday Times, 3 December 2011
 Refusal of further temporary export licence for Joshua Reynolds’ Omai, Department for Culture, Media & Sport, 2 July 2012
 Joshua Reynolds' Omai to remain in UK after Ed Vaizey's intervention, The Guardian, 3 July 2012
 Portrait of Omai at centre of High Court tax dispute, The Daily Telegraph, 30 November 2012
 Magnier's €18m art may be forced back to the UK, Independent.ie, 4 December 2012
 HM Revenue and Customs v The Executors of Lord Howard of Henderskelfe, [2014] EWCA Civ 278 (19 March 2014), BAILII
 Court of Appeal rules £9m Omai painting is 'plant', Accountancy, 19 March 2014
 Lord Howard executors gain final victory in CGT dispute over Reynolds masterpiece, Society of Trust and Estate Practitioners, 19 January 2015 
 Budget 2015: Old masters no longer count as wasting assets, Financial Times,  18 March 2015
 Joshua Reynolds: The Creation of Celebrity, Tate Gallery

Portraits by Joshua Reynolds
1776 paintings